Twin Falls County is a county in the south central part of the U.S. state of Idaho. As of the 2020 Census, the county had a population of 90,046, making it the fifth-most populous county in Idaho. The county seat and largest city is Twin Falls. Twin Falls County is part of the Twin Falls, ID Twin Falls Metropolitan Statistical Area.

Prior to the 1860s, the Twin Falls County area was an unorganized part of Shoshone lands, then as part of the Oregon Country. The area was first organized as part of the original Owyhee County in 1864 as part of Idaho Territory. In 1879 it was partitioned away from Owyhee County to form part of Cassia County. The county is named for a split waterfall on the Snake River of the same name. The Snake River is the county's northern boundary.

Even after Idaho became a state in 1890, the Twin Falls area was very sparsely populated and without significant settlements. That changed after the city of Twin Falls was founded in 1904, and Milner Dam was completed in 1905. Most of the county's other towns were established during this period as well.

Geography

Adjacent counties
Gooding County - north
Jerome County - northeast
Cassia County - east
Elko County, Nevada - south/Pacific Time Border
Owyhee County - west
Elmore County - northwest

Major highways
 US 30
 US 93
 SH-50
 SH-74

National protected areas
 Hagerman Fossil Beds National Monument
 Sawtooth National Forest (part)

Demographics

2000 census
As of the census of 2000, there were 64,284 people, 23,853 households, and 16,959 families living in the county. There were 25,595 housing units at an average density of 13 per square mile (5/km2). The racial makeup of the county was 92.47% White, 0.19% Black or African American, 0.71% Native American, 0.76% Asian, 0.08% Pacific Islander, 3.77% from other races, and 2.02% from two or more races.  9.37% of the population were Hispanic or Latino of any race. 17.9% were of German, 17.7% English, 10.9% American and 7.3% Irish ancestry.

There were 23,853 households, out of which 34.70% had children under the age of 18 living with them, 58.00% were married couples living together, 9.20% had a female householder with no husband present, and 28.90% were non-families. 23.60% of all households were made up of individuals, and 10.40% had someone living alone who was 65 years of age or older.  The average household size was 2.64 and the average family size was 3.13.

In the county, the population was spread out, with 27.90% under the age of 18, 10.40% from 18 to 24, 26.00% from 25 to 44, 21.50% from 45 to 64, and 14.30% who were 65 years of age or older.  The median age was 35 years. For every 100 females, there were 96.50 males.  For every 100 females age 18 and over, there were 93.70 males.

The median income for a household in the county was $34,506, and the median income for a family was $39,886. Males had a median income of $30,058 versus $20,825 for females. The per capita income for the county was $16,678.  About 9.10% of families and 12.70% of the population were below the poverty line, including 16.00% of those under age 18 and 9.30% of those age 65 or over.

2010 census
As of the 2010 United States Census, there were 77,230 people, 28,760 households, and 19,954 families living in the county. The racial makeup of the county was 88.9% white, 1.2% Asian, 0.8% American Indian, 0.4% black or African American, 0.1% Pacific islander, 6.3% from other races, and 2.3% from two or more races. Those of Hispanic or Latino origin made up 13.7% of the population. In terms of ancestry, 20.2% were German, 14.5% were English, 10.8% were Irish, and 7.0% were American.

Of the 28,760 households, 35.4% had children under the age of 18 living with them, 54.1% were married couples living together, 10.5% had a female householder with no husband present, 30.6% were non-families, and 24.3% of all households were made up of individuals. The average household size was 2.65 and the average family size was 3.16. The median age was 34.4 years.

The median income for a household in the county was $42,455 and the median income for a family was $49,188. Males had a median income of $35,777 versus $26,257 for females. The per capita income for the county was $19,892. About 10.6% of families and 13.0% of the population were below the poverty line, including 16.9% of those under age 18 and 10.7% of those age 65 or over.

Communities

Cities
Buhl
Castleford
Filer
Hansen
Hollister
Kimberly
Twin Falls

Towns
Murtaugh

Unincorporated communities
Rogerson

Politics
Twin Falls County leans heavily Republican; it has not voted for a Democratic presidential nominee since 1936, and even in the Democratic landslide of 1964 Barry Goldwater still carried Twin Falls by 20 percentage points.

See also
National Register of Historic Places listings in Twin Falls County, Idaho

Notes

References

External links
County website
County Parcel Map
 

 
Idaho counties
1907 establishments in Idaho
Populated places established in 1907
Twin Falls, Idaho metropolitan area